In probability and statistics, a probability mass function is a function that gives the probability that a discrete random variable is exactly equal to some value.  Sometimes it is also known as the discrete density function. The probability mass function is often the primary means of defining a discrete probability distribution, and such functions exist for either scalar or multivariate random variables whose domain is discrete.

A probability mass function differs from a probability density function (PDF) in that the latter is associated with continuous rather than discrete random variables. A PDF must be integrated over an interval to yield a probability.

The value of the random variable having the largest probability mass is called the mode.

Formal definition

Probability mass function is the probability distribution of a discrete random variable, and provides the possible values and their associated probabilities. It is the function  defined by

The probabilities associated with all (hypothetical) values must be non-negative and sum up to 1,

 and 

Thinking of probability as mass helps to avoid mistakes since the physical mass is conserved as is the total probability for all hypothetical outcomes .

Measure theoretic formulation

A probability mass function of a discrete random variable  can be seen as a special case of two more general measure theoretic constructions: 
We make this more precise below.

Suppose that  is a probability space
In this setting, a random variable  is discrete provided its image is countable.

Now suppose that  is a measure space equipped with the counting measure μ. As a consequence, for any  we have

demonstrating that  is in fact a probability mass function.

The image of  has a countable subset on which the probability mass function  is one.

The discontinuity of probability mass functions is related to the fact that the cumulative distribution function of a discrete random variable is also discontinuous. If  is a discrete random variable, then  means that the casual event  is certain (it is true in 100% of the occurrences); on the contrary,  means that the casual event  is always impossible. Discretization is the process of converting a continuous random variable into a discrete one.

Examples

Finite
There are three major distributions associated, the Bernoulli distribution, the binomial distribution and the geometric distribution.  

Bernoulli distribution: ber(p) , is used to model an experiment with only two possible outcomes. The two outcomes are often encoded as 1 and 0. An example of the Bernoulli distribution is tossing a coin. Since the coin is fair, the probability mass function is 
 Binomial distribution, models the number of successes when someone draws n times with replacement. Each draw or experiment is independent, with two possible outcomes. An example of the binomial distribution is the probability of getting exactly one 6 when someone rolls a fair die three times.
 Geometric distribution describes the number of trials needed to get one success. Its probability mass function is .An example is tossing a coin until the first "heads" appears.  denotes the probability of the outcome "heads", and  denotes the number of necessary coin tosses. Other distributions that can be modeled using a probability mass function are the categorical distribution (also known as the generalized Bernoulli distribution) and the multinomial distribution. 
 If the discrete distribution has two or more categories one of which may occur, whether or not these categories have a natural ordering, when there is only a single trial (draw) this is a categorical distribution.
 An example of a multivariate discrete distribution, and of its probability mass function, is provided by the multinomial distribution. Here the multiple random variables are the numbers of successes in each of the categories after a given number of trials, and each non-zero probability mass gives the probability of a certain combination of numbers of successes in the various categories.

Infinite
The following exponentially declining distribution is an example of a distribution with an infinite number of possible outcomes—all the positive integers:  Despite the infinite number of possible outcomes, the total probability mass is 1/2 + 1/4 + 1/8 + ⋯ = 1, satisfying the unit total probability requirement for a probability distribution.

Multivariate case

Two or more discrete random variables have a joint probability mass function, which gives the probability of each possible combination of realizations for the random variables.

References

Further reading

Types of probability distributions